Martina Svobodová (born October 25, 1983 in Bratislava) is a Slovakian aggressive inline skater who has received gold and silver medals at the X Games as well as other international inline skating competitions.

She won the international Winterclash competition 2008 in Mühlhausen, Germany.

X Games medals
 Park-X-Games
 2002: 1st Place Women (Gold)
 2001: 1st Place Women (Gold)
 2000: 2nd Place Women (Silber)

Winterclash Results 
 2008: 1st Place Girls at Winterclash

References

1983 births
Living people
Slovak roller skaters
Sportspeople from Bratislava